Selvin Hernán González Morán (4 July 1981 - 26 May 2006) was a Salvadoran footballer.

Club career
González played for Salvadoran premier division side Alianza and second division outfits Coca-Cola, Once Municipal and Real San Martín.

International career
Selvin González was part of the Salvadoran 2002 Central American and Caribbean Games gold medal-winning squad. He scored the decisive spot-kick of the penalty shoot-out in the final against Mexico.

He then made his senior debut for El Salvador in a January 2003 friendly match against Guatemala and had earned a total of 3 caps, scoring no goals. His final international was a November 2003 friendly match against Jamaica.

Death
Accompanied by three friends, González was in his girlfriend's house on 26 May 2006, when he was shot by armed men. He died of internal bleeding a few hours later in a medical centre. He was buried in Soyapango on 29 May 2006. Witnesses suspected the attackers to be members of the gang of the Colonia Los Ángeles.

A minute of silence was held before the 2006 Clausura championship final between Águila and FAS, two days after González died.

References

External links
 
 Selvin González se despidió - Diario de Hoy 

1981 births
2006 deaths
Association football defenders
Salvadoran footballers
El Salvador international footballers
Alianza F.C. footballers
Once Municipal footballers
Male murder victims
Salvadoran murder victims
People murdered in El Salvador
Deaths by firearm in El Salvador
2006 crimes in El Salvador
2006 murders in North America
2000s murders in El Salvador
Deaths from bleeding

ar:ويليام أنطونيو توريس